The Rossiya Theatre, formerly known as the Pushkinsky Cinema is monument of architecture and currently the largest theatre in Moscow operated by Stage Entertainment. It is located in Pushkinskaya Square.

History 

The Rossiya Cinema was built in 1961. In 1997, The Rossiya was leased (and then eventually sold) to the  film distributor Karo Film, which renovated the theatre and changed its name to Pushkinsky. The Pushkinsky was leased in 2012 to Stage Entertainment Russia for five years.

Productions 
 2012-2014: The Little Mermaid (Russian premiering, 503 perf)
 2014: Chicago (16 perf, Continuation of the original revival premiering on October 5, 2013, in MDM Theatre)
 2014-2015: Beauty and the Beast (revival, 245 perf)
 2015-2016: Singin' in the Rain (Russian premiering, Currently playing)
 2016-2017: Cinderella (European premiering, Coming soon)

See also 
 Pushkinskaya Square
 Tverskaya Street
 MDM Theater (also operated by Stage Entertainment)

External links 

 Rossiya Theatre - Stage Entertainment Russia
 Stage Entertainment Theatres Russia
 «Karo Film Pushkinsky» Cinema (Internet Archive)
 The Rossiya Theatre has opened for musicals

Cinemas in Russia
Buildings and structures in Moscow
Culture in Moscow
Tverskoy District
Theatres in Moscow
Moscow International Film Festival
1961 establishments in Russia
2012 in theatre
Theatres completed in 1961
1961 in film